Kaolinovo is a town in northeastern Bulgaria, part of Shumen Province. It is the administrative centre of the homonymous Kaolinovo Municipality, which lies in the northern part of Shumen Province. As of December 2009, the town has a population of 1,538 inhabitants.

Kaolinovo was named after its main product: the municipality is rich in high-quality kaolin (china clay), with a mine and an ore dressing plant present. The reserves amount to 65 million tonnes.

Municipality

Kaolinovo municipality includes the following 16 places:

References

External links
 Kaolinovo municipality website 

Towns in Bulgaria
Populated places in Shumen Province